Julien Tinayre (26 October 1859 – 2 July 1923) was a French illustrator and wood-engraver.

References

1859 births
1923 deaths
19th-century French engravers
19th-century French male artists
20th-century French engravers
20th-century French male artists
19th-century French illustrators
20th-century French illustrators